A  breathing mask is a mask that covers the mouth, and usually other parts of the face or head, designed to direct the wearer's breath to and/or from a particular apparatus. It may mean, or be part of, one of these:

 Medical treatment
 Cardiopulmonary resuscitation
 Bag valve mask, a device used in resuscitation of non-breathing casualties, optionally using supplementary oxygen.
 Pocket CPR mask, a simpler mask used for mouth-to-mouth resuscitation; easier to carry than bag valve masks
 Supplying altered air
 Built-in breathing system (BIBS) mask, an oro-nasal mask providing treatment, decompression, or emergency gas in a hyperbaric chamber
 Non-rebreather mask, an oro-nasal mask used in medicine to assist in the delivery of oxygen therapy
 Oxygen mask, which covers the mouth and nose of a patient undergoing oxygen therapy as first aid or longer-term treatment, or a passenger in an aircraft which has depressurised at altitude
 Continuous positive airway pressure mask
 Anesthetic mask

 Infection control
 Surgical mask, also known as a procedure mask, is intended to be worn by health professionals during surgery, to protect the patient from being infected by the surgeon's breath.
 Cloth mask; early surgical masks were cloth. Cloth masks are also used for protection in pandemics.
 Respirators (see below) may also be used for infection control

 Respirator, a device designed to protect the wearer from inhaling harmful dusts, fumes, vapors or gases
Air-filtering respirators
 Dust mask, a flexible pad held over the nose and mouth by elastic or rubber straps to protect against dusts encountered during construction or cleaning activities. Usually uncertified, and thus not considered a "respirator" in some jurisdictions.
 Filtering facepiece respirator, a stiffish dome of filter material fitting over the nose, cheeks, and chin. May look like some dust masks, but is certified.
 Elastomeric respirator, made of rubbery elastomer, usually reusable with disposable filters. May protect against particulates, gasses, or both, depending on the filters used.
 Gas masks in conflict, elastomeric respirators designed to protect the user from toxic gases in conflicts
 Early smoke-mask respiratorss for firefighters (similar to diving helmets, but with air-filtering)
Air-supply respirators; see also Breathing set (disambiguation)
 SCBA mask, or BA mask, a full face mask covering the mouth, nose and eyes of a person wearing self-contained breathing apparatus
 Rebreather mask
 Underwater breathing masks
 Full face snorkelling mask, a watertight mask with integrated air passages allowing the user to breathe atmospheric air while swimming face-down at the surface of the water
 Diving mask and full face diving mask, watertight masks covering the mouth, nose and (in the latter case) eyes, allowing the wearer to breathe underwater from a self-contained or surface-supplied breathing gas supply
 Diving helmet, covering the entire head in a dome of air.

By coverage
Quarter-mask or orinasal mask, covering the mouth and nose only
Half-mask (disambiguation), from below the eyes to below the chin
Fullface mask, from above the eyes to below the chin